The M1161 Growler is officially the Internally Transportable Light Strike Vehicle (ITV-LSV) designed specifically for use with the  Osprey tiltrotor aircraft. Fulfilling multiple roles of light utility, light strike and fast attack vehicle, the M1161 Growler is smaller than most international vehicles in the same role. It has taken over duties of the M151 jeep-type variants and replaced the Interim Fast Attack Vehicle (IFAV).

A separate US Marine Corps variant, the shorter two-seat M1163 prime mover is combined with the M327 towed 120mm heavy mortar, and also became its ammunition hauler after the M1162 trailer was cancelled.

History
Development for the Growler began in 1999 by American Growler when the Marine Corps sought a vehicle that could be transported in a  Osprey. Though the initial design used elements and parts from the drive train of the M151 which it was intended to replace, the final design featured entirely new parts and systems to allow it to fulfill its mission. This included allowing it to fit within the confines of a 's cargo bay. No major components from the M151 design are used in the manufacture of the M1161 or M1163 variant. Initial engineering of the M1161 is most closely related to American Growler's commercial UV 100 DB off-road vehicle.  Manufacture of the Growler variants was later transferred to General Dynamics facilities but are otherwise identical.

Development
Two different versions of the Growler were developed; the M1161 light strike vehicle (LSV), and the M1163 prime mover variant as part of the Expeditionary Fire Support System (EFSS) towed heavy 120mm mortar. A number of the separate 36-round ammunition trailers, the M1162, were ordered but further design was dropped and its duties to carry the 35 lb mortar shells were incorporated into the M1163 Prime Mover. The M1161 LSV variant is armed with either an M2HB .50cal BMG machine gun, M240G 7.62mm MG or Mk19 40mm automatic grenade launcher. The 120mm mortar towed by the M1163 Prime Mover is the French RT-120, deployed by United States forces as the M327 Dragon Fire. The Growler's central role of cross-country scout and aerially-deployed forward unit has led to further modifications, including use of the rifled precision extended range munition (PERM) system.

On November 10, 2004, the Marine Corps Systems Command (MCSC) awarded indefinite-delivery, indefinite-quantity contract M67854-05-D-6014 with firm-fixed-price and cost-plus-award-fee contract line-item numbers for a base year and up to six option years to General Dynamics Ordnance and Tactical Systems (GDOTS) for $12,057,159 for procurement of 66 EFSSs and up to 650 ITVs. The MCSC selected GDOTS over two other offerors. On September 20, 2007, Senator Carl Levin, Chairman of the Senate Committee on Armed Services filed a protest on behalf of a constituent, Rae-Beck Automotive, LLC, a subcontractor to one of the losing offerors. The DOD inspector general's audit did not substantiate most of the constituent’s concerns, but did note concerns with the MCSC program management and contract award for the EFSS and ITV programs.

By 2008, unit cost had risen by 120%, leaving each Growler scout variant with a cost of $209,000 per unit. The prime mover mortar contract price rose by 86%, to $1,078,000 cost per unit. The first Growlers were deployed to Marine units in January 2009 for field testing, one year beyond the contracted delivery date. By August 2011, 209 M1161s and 102 M1163s had been produced, with 42 additional M1163s on order. Eventually, 266 M1161 ITVs and another 145 "prime mover" variants were purchased. The vehicles saw combat with elements of MARSOC in Afghanistan from 2011-2014.

Problems with M1161 and M1163's throttle system were identified in May 2012 following an accident at MCB Camp Pendleton, California. The entire vehicle fleet was grounded, pending repair.

During RIMPAC 2014, the Marines fitted a Growler ITV with Torc Robotics' Ground Unmanned Support Surrogate (GUSS) system, turning it into an unmanned ground vehicle. A Marine can take direct control of the vehicle through a robotic controller or switch it to manual operation and drive it themselves if needed. The unmanned ITV may be fielded within five years.

Replacement
In June 2012, the United States Special Operations Command (USSOCOM) expressed interest in procuring Non Developmental Item (NDI) vehicles that would be highly mobile,  transportable platforms. The Marines are seeking a replacement for the Growler ITV, running parallel with SOCOM's efforts to develop a new Osprey-transportable vehicle. The effort comes from higher demand in operations and the service's Expeditionary Force 21 concept, which emphasizes lighter forces. Quick-reaction Marine expeditionary units typically deploy with as many as 20 ITVs.

A limited objective experiment and technical assessment was conducted by the Marine Corps Warfighting Laboratory in September 2015 to define the need and find vehicles to fill it, performing missions ranging from light strike to logistics and casualty evacuation. The conclusion was that the ITV vehicles were ineffective as a strike vehicle, but worked well as a logistics vehicle by removing a lot of weight from Marines' backs.

Manufactured between 2004 and 2010, Growler ITV procurement and fielding was ineffectively timed since operations in Iraq and Afghanistan led to most units relying on armored vehicles because of the threat of roadside bombs. Originally intended for infantry, Growlers were fielded primarily with reconnaissance, marine special operations, and artillery communities. A new ITV would be fielded with infantry forces to serve company-sized landing teams. Although designed for light strike, experiments have shown an ITV's greatest roles to be casualty evacuation (CASEVAC) and logistics to lighten individuals' loads. Replacement efforts were anticipated to begin in 2018.

Civilian Sales
In February 2019, GovPlanet announced that it will be selling the ITV Growlers to the public for the first time. Growlers will be sold in a public auction setting in March 2019.

Operators

Current operators
  United States Marine Corps: 600 
Plus "approximately 1,000 vehicles to foreign militaries around the world."

See also
 Desert Patrol Vehicles
 Interim Fast Attack Vehicle
 Spider LSV
 Phantom Badger
 SPECTRE light vehicle

References

External links
 Official site of Growler Manufacturing and Engineering, the current Growler manufacturer.
 Current Growler brochure PDF
 Current Growler Prime Mover brochure
 Marines take fight to the enemy with EFSS
 GovPlanet set to sell U.S. military ITV and MTVR vehicles for first time ever 

Military vehicles of the United States
Military light utility vehicles
Soft-skinned vehicles
Military vehicles introduced in the 2000s